Grimkesee is a lake in Schwerin, Mecklenburg-Vorpommern, Germany. At an elevation of ca. 40 m, its surface area is 0.038 km².

Lakes of Mecklenburg-Western Pomerania